Michalis Oikonomou (also Mihalis Ikonomou or Michael Economou; Greek: Μιχάλης Οικονόμου, 1888–1933) was a Greek impressionist painter. He was born in 1888 in Piraeus in the Attica prefecture (then Attica-Viotia) and went to school there. His first art teacher was Konstantinos Volanakis. In 1906, he moved to Paris, where he studied shipbuilding, and also attended art school there. Between 1913 and 1926, he had three one-man shows (two in Paris and one in London) and took part in many group exhibits. He returned to Greece in 1926 and lived in Athens. He studied there in Parnassos. In 1929, his last exhibit was shown at the Public Theatre in Piraeus. He died in Athens in 1933. He used mostly earthy colours, including browns and greens.

References 

1888 births
1933 deaths
Artists from Piraeus
Impressionist painters
Greek painters
19th-century Greek painters
20th-century Greek painters